Hizbul Wathan Football Club is a professional Indonesian football team based in Sidoarjo Regency, East Java. They compete in the second tier of Indonesian league, Liga 2.

History
Semeru FC is an amalgamation of other Lumajang regional teams. In 2017, hopes of promoting regional football and building community pride., regent ASAT Malik met with local football clubs including Persigo Gorontalo, based in Gorontalo to discuss a merger. The owner of Persigo Gorontalo, Ngateman, and ASAT Malik finalized a merger agreement and renamed Persigo Gorontalo to Semeru FC.

In forming Semeru FC, local Lumajang footballers hope to raise the standard of their play and break into national football. As of 2017 the team was in the Liga Nusantara level.

On 25 February 2020, Muhammadiyah East Java Region Leadership confirmed that it has acquired Semeru FC, one of the participating Liga 2 football clubs. They acquired Semeru FC who this season competed in Liga 2. In addition, they will compete under the name PS Hizbul Wathan and headquartered at the Gelora Delta Stadium. The Chairman of PW Muhammadiyah East Java M. Saad Ibrahim said, the acquisition was carried out because Muhammadiyah wanted to preach through football.
Despite being a new territory, the organization founded by KH Ahmad Dahlan wanted to instill the values of Islam, nationality and humanity through football. Its cadres like Soeratin used to be the pioneers of the birth of PSSI. History is trying to be knitted again. One of the steps taken by the Head of Muhammadiyah Region (PWM) of East Java.

Logo

Source

Coaching Staff

Stadium

Hizbul Wathan Football Club Sidoarjo plays their home matches at Gelora Delta Stadium  in 2020.

References

External links

Football clubs in Indonesia
Football clubs in East Java
Association football clubs established in 2020
2020 establishments in Indonesia